Ruperto Alaura is a Cebuano writer. He was a LUDABI prize winner in 1961, the same organization that Martin Abellana was in as well.

Short stories
 Usa ka Hataas nga Gabii (A Long Night), published in Bisaya Magasin in 1961.
 Mga Pugas nga Bulawan (Seeds of Gold), published in Bag-ong Suga.
 Ang Damgo (The Dream), published in Silaw.
 Sukod (Measure), published in Bag-ong Suga.

References
 www.bisaya.com Visayan Literature page—defunct

Visayan writers
Cebuano writers
Filipino writers
Cebuano people
Possibly living people
Year of birth missing